Meteoria erythrops is a species of blind cusk eel native to the Atlantic Ocean where it is found at depths of from .  This species grows to a length of  SL.  This is the only known species in its genus.

References
 

Aphyonidae
Fish described in 1969